Jayasimha Malla was the fifth Malla king of Nepal. He succeeded Jayabhimadeva and reigned from 1271 until he was deposed in 1274. His relationship with the dynasty started by Aridev Malla, the first Malla king of Nepal, is still unknown.

Early life 
He was a local lord in Bhadgaon and started gathering political powers during the reigns of Abhaya Malla, and Jayadeva Malla. He, along with Jayabhimadeva of Banepa (then called Bhonta) controlled much of the places surrounding them and greatly reduced the powers of the presiding monarch.

Reign 
Jayadeva Malla, the last king from the lineage of Aridev Malla, died in 1258. Following his death, Jayasimha and Jayabhimadeva of Bhonta met at Palanchok and came to an agreement to alternate the throne. Jaybhimadeva then started to reign in Nepal and was succeeded by Jayasimha in 1271. Not much is clear about his reign and he was either deposed or abdicated in 1274 after which he was succeeded by Ananta Malla.

References

Citations

Bibliography 

 
 

Malla rulers of the Kathmandu Valley
13th-century Nepalese people
1229 births
1287 deaths
Nepalese monarchs
History of Nepal